Diego Macedo Prado dos Santos (born 8 May 1987 in Americana, São Paulo) is a Brazilian footballer, who currently plays for Santo André.

Career
Macedo left in summer 2009 his club União Agrícola Barbarense Futebol Clube to sign for Clube Atlético Bragantino. On 19 May 2010 Atletico Mineiro signed the right winger from Bragantino, the young player became a two years contract. However, the club terminated his contract after the 2010 season.

On 25 March 2011, he signed a one-year contract with Ceará.

Club statistics
Updated to 23 February 2017.

References

External links

Profile at Hokkaido Consadole Sapporo

1987 births
Living people
People from Americana, São Paulo
Brazilian footballers
Brazilian expatriate footballers
Expatriate footballers in Portugal
Rio Branco Esporte Clube players
Brazilian expatriate sportspeople in Portugal
S.C. Braga players
União Agrícola Barbarense Futebol Clube players
Brasiliense Futebol Clube players
Londrina Esporte Clube players
Rio Branco Sport Club players
Ceilândia Esporte Clube players
Clube Atlético Bragantino players
Clube Atlético Mineiro players
Sport Club Corinthians Paulista players
Esporte Clube Bahia players
Hokkaido Consadole Sapporo players
Esporte Clube Santo André players
Campeonato Brasileiro Série A players
Campeonato Brasileiro Série B players
J2 League players
Expatriate footballers in Japan
Association football midfielders
Footballers from São Paulo (state)